Frederick Karl Bruney (December 30, 1931 – January 22, 2016) was an American college and professional American football defensive back.

College career
Bruney played halfback on both the offensive and defensive sides of the ball for the Ohio State University Buckeyes from 1950 to 1952.  He scored six touchdowns for the Buckeyes in the 1952 season, but he was known primarily for his defensive play.  He had 17 career interceptions, which remains second in the Ohio State record book.  Bruney was selected first-team All-Big Ten in 1952.

Professional career
Bruney was drafted in the third round of the 1953 NFL Draft by the Cleveland Browns. On September 22, 1953 he is traded  to the San Francisco 49ers to get to get to the regular season roster size limit. He ultimately played in the National Football League for the San Francisco 49ers, the Pittsburgh Steelers, and the Los Angeles Rams.  In 1960 he joined the Boston Patriots of the upstart American Football League.  He played there for three seasons and was a two-time AFL All-Star selection.

Coaching career
Bruney was appointed the interim head coach of the Philadelphia Eagles for the last game of the 1985 NFL season after former coach Marion Campbell was let go with one game remaining in the season. That game was a 37-35 win over the Minnesota Vikings.  The Eagles' 37 points in Week 16 was the most they had scored in a game in over 4 years. Bruney was replaced by Buddy Ryan for the 1986 season.  Bruney served as an assistant coach throughout his long NFL career with the Eagles, Falcons, Buccaneers, Giants and Colts.  He retired from the NFL after the 1997 season, at the time he held the longest tenure as a player and coach in Pro Football. Bruney died in Sandy Springs, Georgia on January 22, 2016.

Head coaching record

See also
 List of American Football League players

References

1931 births
2016 deaths
American football halfbacks
Atlanta Falcons coaches
Boston Patriots (AFL) coaches
Boston Patriots players
Los Angeles Rams players
Ohio State Buckeyes football players
Philadelphia Eagles coaches
Pittsburgh Steelers players
San Francisco 49ers players
Tampa Bay Buccaneers coaches
American Football League All-Star players
People from Martins Ferry, Ohio
National Football League defensive coordinators
Philadelphia Eagles head coaches